Gabriel Correia da Mata (born 25 December 1999), commonly known as Bodão, is a Brazilian footballer who currently plays as a midfielder for América-TO.

Career statistics

Club

Notes

References

1999 births
Living people
Brazilian footballers
Association football midfielders
Campeonato Brasileiro Série C players
Volta Redonda FC players
América Futebol Clube (Teófilo Otoni) players